Henry William Cave M.A., F.R.G.S., M.R.A.S. (23 February 1854 - 28 October 1913) was a British author, photographer, publisher and amateur archaeologist.

Henry William Cave was born on 23 February 1854 in Brackley, Northamptonshire, the son of William Cave and Louisa née Wilson. He studied at Magdalen College School, and Queen’s College, Oxford.

In 1872, at the age of eighteen Cave left his studies at Oxford and travelled to Ceylon, as the private secretary to the Anglican Bishop of Colombo, Reginald Copleston. Cave edited the diocesan magazine, Ceylon Diocesan Gazette, and became interested in publishing, printing and photography. In 1876 he opened a bookstore in Upper Chatham Street, Colombo fort, with the encouragement of the Bishop, mainly selling bibles and religious tracts. By 1884 the business, H. W. Cave and Company, had diversified becoming a well established printing and publishing firm, as well as selling musical instruments and sporting goods (including billiard tables, rickshaws and bicycles). After occupying a site in Janadhipathi Mawatha (formerly Queen's Street), now the Central Bank offices, the company in 1896 moved their offices to the Gaffoor Building on Sir Baron Jayathilaka Mawatha (formerly Prince Street) and the printing presses to an establishment on Justice Akbar Mawatha in Slave Island. In 1918 the company expanded into motor vehicle sales.

He married Laura Emma Long (1856-1885) on 7 February 1880 in Richmond, Surrey, and they had three children, Laura Mary (b.1881), Kathleen Kalani (b.1885), and Cecil Gordon (b.1896). Cave’s wife, Emma, died in 1886 when he was just 32 and he returned to England leaving his brothers and a nephew in charge of the business, while he completed his degree and Master of Arts at Oxford.

Cave made seventeen voyages to Ceylon and India, including detailed explorations of the remains of Anuradhapura and Polonnaruwa in 1896.

Between 1893 and 1908, he wrote and published several important books on Ceylon, including a guide to its railways and the tea plantations, all illustrated with his own photographs.

Cave was a fellow of the Royal Geographical Society and a member of Royal Asiatic Society.

He died on 28 October 1913 in Brighton, Sussex and is buried at Woodvale Cemetery, Brighton.

Bibliography

References

External link

Sri Lankan photographers
Sri Lankan writers
Sri Lankan people of English descent
1854 births
1913 deaths
People from Northamptonshire
Alumni of Magdalen College, Oxford
Alumni of The Queen's College, Oxford
Burials in East Sussex